Middleton is a city in Canyon County, Idaho, United States. The population was 9,091 at the 2021 consensus, up from 5,524 at the 2010 census and 2,978 in 2000. It is part of the Boise City–Nampa, Idaho Metropolitan Statistical Area.

History
Middleton was named for its location between the old fort Boise and Keeney's Ferry; it being the midpoint between the two. It served as a rest stop for those heading for Keeney's Ferry. It had a stage station in the early days of the Oregon Trail, a post office in 1866 and a water powered grist mill in 1871. The Ward Massacre occurred near the site in 1854.

Middleton is the oldest settlement in Canyon County, with the land being parceled out in 1863 by William N. Montgomery. The Boise River flooded in 1872 and cut a new channel, isolating the town on an island; as a result, the town moved to a new location in the years after 1880. The town incorporated as a city in 1910, although the certificate was not issued until 1971. The present mayor is Steve Rule.

On February 1, 2007, 78% of Middleton High School burned down, caused by the overheating of a fan above the weight room. The 42-year-old building was built when fire codes required sprinklers to be installed, but there was no provision for their functionality. To save money during the construction of the school in the 1960s, the sprinklers were installed but were never connected to a water source.

Geography

Demographics

2010 census
At the 2010 census there were 5,524 people in 1,843 households, including 1,392 families, in the city. The racial makup of the city was 92.5% White, 0.3% African American, 0.6% Native American, 0.5% Asian, 0.1% Pacific Islander, 3.3% from other races, and 2.8% from two or more races. Hispanic or Latino of any race were 10.0%.

Of the 1,843 households 49.5% had children under the age of 18 living with them, 54.7% were married couples living together, 13.6% had a female householder with no husband present, 7.2% had a male householder with no wife present, and 24.5% were non-families. 19.9% of households were one person and 7.1% were one person aged 65 or older. The average household size was 3.00 and the average family size was 3.45.

The median age was 30.5 years. 35.1% of residents were under the age of 18; 7.6% were between the ages of 18 and 24; 29.9% were from 25 to 44; 19.1% were from 45 to 64; and 8.2% were 65 or older. The gender makeup of the city was 49.9% male and 50.1% female.

2000 census
At the 2000 census there were 2,978 people in 1,017 households, including 755 families, in the city. The racial makup of the city was 91.67% White, 0.30% African American, 1.07% Native American, 0.24% Asian, 0.24% Pacific Islander, 3.53% from other races, and 2.96% from two or more races. Hispanic or Latino of any race were 10.21%.

Of the 1,017 households 43.8% had children under the age of 18 living with them, 57.6% were married couples living together, 11.6% had a female householder with no husband present, and 25.7% were non-families. 18.5% of households were one person and 6.9% were one person aged 65 or older. The average household size was 2.93 and the average family size was 3.35.

The age distribution was 34.2% under the age of 18, 10.4% from 18 to 24, 31.9% from 25 to 44, 15.8% from 45 to 64, and 7.7% 65 or older. The median age was 28 years. For every 100 females, there were 97.9 males. For every 100 females age 18 and over, there were 94.9 males.

The median household income was $32,665 and the median family income was $34,734. Males had a median income of $27,298 versus $20,792 for females. The per capita income for the city was $12,447. About 7.5% of families and 10.4% of the population were below the poverty line, including 12.8% of those under age 18 and 16.5% of those age 65 or over.

Transportation
The city is served by State Highway 44. It connects to Interstate 84 at exit 25, three miles (5 km) to the west; the city of Star is six miles (10 km) to the east on SH-44.

Notable people
Erik Fisher, a World Cup alpine ski racer 
Sierra Jackson, sprint car racer
George Kennedy, actor 
Alison Rabe, attorney and member of the Idaho Senate 
Carlos Trujillo, long-distance runner

References

External links

 - City of Middleton
Middleton Chamber of Commerce

Boise metropolitan area
Cities in Canyon County, Idaho
Cities in Idaho